Edmund Holland may refer to:
 Edmund Holland, 4th Earl of Kent
 Edmund Milton Holland, American comedian